"Give a Little Credit to the Navy" is a World War I song written by Buddy DeSylva & Gus Kahn and composed by Albert Gumble. This song was published in 1918 by Jerome H. Remick & Co., in Detroit, MI.

The sheet music cover, illustrated by Starmer, features photos of Commander William Buel Frankling, USNRF, Del Chain and Sidney Phillips, with ships in the background.

The sheet music can be found at the Pritzker Military Museum & Library.

References

Bibliography
Parker, Bernard S. World War I Sheet Music 1. Jefferson: McFarland & Company, Inc., 2007. . 
Rubin, Richard. 2014. The last of the doughboys: the forgotten generation and their forgotten World War. . 

Vogel, Frederick G. World War I Songs: A History and Dictionary of Popular American Patriotic Tunes, with Over 300 Complete Lyrics. Jefferson: McFarland & Company, Inc., 1995. . 

Works about the United States Navy
1918 songs
Songs of World War I
Songs with lyrics by Gus Kahn
Songs with lyrics by Buddy DeSylva